X Nine (stylized as X-NINE) is a Chinese boy group under Wajijiwa Entertainment. Consisting of eight members: Xiao Zhan, Gu Jiacheng, Wu Jiacheng, Peng Chuyue, Guo Zifan, Zhao Lei, Xia Zhiguang, and Yan Xujia, the group debuted on September 28, 2016 with their first single, "In Our Own Name". They were formed through EE Media, Tencent Video, and SM Entertainment’s joint Chinese idol survival program X-Fire (燃烧吧少年).

Name
The X in the group's name represents "unknown and infinite possibilities" while the character 玖 (jiǔ) references the Chinese folktale, The Nine Sons of The Dragon.

Members
Current
Xiao Zhan (肖战) – Main vocalist, visuals
Peng Chuyue (彭楚粤) – Leader, Main vocalist
Zhao Lei (赵磊) – Main vocalist
Wu Jiacheng (伍嘉成) – Leader, Main vocalist
Guo Zifan (郭子凡) – Main dancer
Xia Zhiguang (夏之光) – Main dancer
Gu Jiacheng (谷嘉诚) – Rapper, Visual
Yan Xujia (焉栩嘉) – Rapper

Former
 Chen Zexi (陈泽希) – Rapper, dancer

Discography

Single

Mini albums

Filmography

Films
Monster Hunt 2 (2018)
Super Star Academy
Oh! My Emperor!
Fights Break Sphere (2018)

Variety shows
X-Fire (2015)
X Nine Channel (2016–2017)

Radio
X Nine's Exclusive Radio

Awards and nominations

Asian Music Gala Awards

Asian New Songs Annual Festival

Tencent Video Starlight Awards

Fans Carnival Annual Festival

References 

Chinese boy bands
Chinese pop music groups
Chinese idols
Mandopop musical groups
Musical groups established in 2016
2016 establishments in China